Michael Arthur Cleary AO (born 30 April 1940) is an Australian former rugby union and rugby league and footballer of the 1950s, 1960s and 1970s, and politician. He represented Australia in both rugby codes as well as in athletics making him one of only four Australians who have represented their country at full international level in three different sports. He represented as a Wallaby in 6 Tests in 1961 and as a Kangaroo in 8 Tests from 1962.

Early life
Cleary was born in Randwick, New South Wales and was educated at Waverley College. At aged 17 having set a number of schoolboy sprint records he was offered a sporting scholarship to Stanford University which he declined with his sights set on representing Australia in athletics.

Rugby union
In 1959 he joined the Randwick DRUFC and he played in the club's 1960 winning first-grade premiership side. He was selected in the Australian national side for all three Tests of the 1961 series against Fiji and made further Wallaby appearances against France and against the Springboks on the 1961 tour of South Africa.

Athletics
After leaving rugby union and during his first year of rugby league with the South Sydney Rabbitohs he maintained his amateur status to enable his selection for the Commonwealth Games later that year. He represented Australia in Athletics at the 1962 British Empire and Commonwealth Games in Perth, collecting the Bronze Medal for the 100-yard sprint. The Gregory's source records him as having clocked 9.3 secs for the 100 yards during his athletic career.

In 1964 he beat the rugby league speedster Ken Irvine in a A£2,000 match race at Wentworth Park, and in 1966 he won the Australian professional 130m sprint race.

Rugby league
Cleary joined the South Sydney Rabbitohs in 1962 along with Jim Lisle his Wallaby three-quarter partner. Cleary was a Winger with the club throughout the 1960s playing in three premiership winning sides in
1967, 1968 and 1970. Cleary finished his first grade career with the Rabbitoh's neighbouring club, the Eastern Suburbs Roosters, in 1971. This made him ideally suited to represent his future NSW State electoral district of Coogee, which sits close to the geographic border between the two clubs.

His international rugby league debut in the 1st Test against Great Britain in Sydney on 9 June 1962 saw Cleary become Australia's 29th dual-code international, following Arthur Summons and preceding Jim Lisle. He made Test appearances against New Zealand in 1963, 1965 and 1969; against France in 1964 and was selected for the 1963–64 Kangaroo tour of Great Britain and France during which he made one Test and twenty tour match appearances.

Triple international
He is one of only four Australian sportsmen to represent internationally in three different sports at the senior level (see also Dick Thornett and Snowy Baker).

Politics and community
Cleary joined the Labor Party in 1965 and was the State member for Coogee in the New South Wales Legislative Assembly from 1974 to 1991 and was the NSW Minister for Sport and Recreation and Tourism in the Wran Labor Government from 1981 to 1988. From 1986 to 1988 he was also the NSW Minister for Racing.

He was at one time or another the Chairman Sports House Advisory Committee, member North Bondi Surf Life Saving Club, member Coogee Surf Life Saving Club and a director South Sydney Leagues Club.

In the Queen's Birthday Honours list of 1992, Cleary was awarded an Officer of the Order of Australia for his service to the New South Wales Parliament, and in 2000 he was awarded the Australian Sports Medal for his achievements as a Kangaroo player. He was inducted into the Sport Australia Hall of Fame in 1999.

Cleary was a wrestling commentator for World Championship Wrestling.

References

 

1940 births
Australian male sprinters
Athletes (track and field) at the 1962 British Empire and Commonwealth Games
Commonwealth Games bronze medallists for Australia
Commonwealth Games medallists in athletics
Dual-code rugby internationals
Australian rugby league players
Australia national rugby league team players
Australian rugby union players
Members of the New South Wales Legislative Assembly
Officers of the Order of Australia
South Sydney Rabbitohs players
Sport Australia Hall of Fame inductees
Living people
Australia international rugby union players
Australian sportsperson-politicians
Professional wrestling announcers
Sydney Roosters players
Rugby league players from Sydney
Athletes from Sydney
Rugby union players from Sydney
Rugby union wings
Medallists at the 1962 British Empire and Commonwealth Games